Ich hatt' einen Kameraden  is a traditional lament of the German armed forces written in 1809.

Ich hatt' einen Kameraden is also a German-language title for:
The Good Comrade , 1923 German film 
I Had a Comrade , 1924 German film 
I Once Had a Comrade, 1926 German film